The 37th Thailand National Games (Thai:การแข่งขันกีฬาแห่งชาติ ครั้งที่ 37 "พิษณุโลกเกมส์") also known (2008 National Games, Phitsanulok Games) held in Phitsanulok, Thailand  during 14 to 24 December 2015. Representing were 35 sports. This games held in Phitsanulok Sport Center, Phitsanulok sport school, etc. and Nakhon Sawan hosted 17th national games in 1984.

Sports

Top ten medals

External links
 Sports Authority of Thailand
 Official website of the 37th National Games in Phitsanulok

National Games
Thailand National Games
National Games
Thailand National Games
National Games